Statistics of Austrian league in the 1947–48 season.

Overview
It was contested by 10 teams, and SK Rapid Wien won the championship.

League standings

Results

References
Austria - List of final tables (RSSSF)

Austrian Football Bundesliga seasons
Austria
1947–48 in Austrian football